Joe Black Hayes Sr. (September 20, 1915 − December 9, 2013) was an American football player and coach.

Born in Murfreesboro, Tennessee, Hayes played for the Tennessee Volunteers. Hayes was an assistant under Charles "Bubber" Murphy for the Middle Tennessee State Blue Raiders.

Joe Black Hayes died on December 9, 2013, aged 98, at a nursing home in his hometown of Murfreesboro, Tennessee. He was survived by his two sons, nine grandchildren, and nine great-grandchildren.

References

1915 births
2013 deaths
American football guards
Cumberland Phoenix football coaches
Middle Tennessee Blue Raiders football coaches
Tennessee Volunteers football players
UT Martin Skyhawks football coaches
People from Murfreesboro, Tennessee
Players of American football from Tennessee